The Other Woman is a smooth jazz collaborative studio album by ARIA Award winning recording artists, Deni Hines and James Morrison.
The album was released in October 2007. 
Hines and Morrison toured the album throughout late 2007/early 2008 and recorded a live DVD of the tour.

At the ARIA Music Awards of 2008, The Other Woman was nominated for 'ARIA Award for Best Jazz Album', losing out to Footprints by Andrea Keller.

Track listing

Charts

Weekly charts

Year-end charts
The Other Woman was the highest selling Jazz and Blues album by an Australian artist in 2007.

Credits
 Alto saxophone, tenor saxophone, clarinet – Mark Taylor 
 Arranged by James Morrison
 Double bass, electric bass – Phil Stack
 Drums – Gordon Rytmeister
 Guitar – James Muller
 Piano, keyboards – Tim Fisher
 Recorded and mixed by Daniel Brown
 Trombone [solo] – Dave Panichi 
 Trumpet – Ralph Pyl
 Trumpet, flugelhorn, cornet, trumpet [digital], organ [Hammond], piano – James Morrison
 Violin, strings – Ian Cooper

Release history

References

2007 albums
Deni Hines albums
MGM Records albums
Jazz albums by Australian artists